Le Grand Prix du Roman is a French literary award, created in 1914, and given each year by the Académie française. Along with the Prix Goncourt, the award is one of the oldest and most prestigious literary awards in France. The Académie française gives out over 60 literary awards each year, and the Grand Prix du roman is the most senior for an individual novel.

List of laureates of the Grand prix du roman

References

External links
 

Awards established in 1918
Académie Française awards
French fiction awards